A feeder, is a feed holder, such as fixed holder or trailer-mounted hopper, delivering feed or fodder to cattle, sheep, horses and other livestock.

See also 
 Manger

References

Livestock